Navy Cargo Handling Battalions (NCHBs) are expeditionary logistics units of the United States Navy.

History

The Cargo Handling Battalions trace their lineage to U.S. Navy's first "Combat Stevedores" - the 41 "Special" Naval Construction Battalions, created during WWII.

Warfare qualification

Sailors assigned to NCHBs are eligible to earn designation as Enlisted Expeditionary Warfare Specialist. To do this, candidates must attend various training events over the course of several months and then demonstrate their knowledge at an oral board.

List of Navy Cargo Handling Battalions

References

Sources
 Verneris, J. (2015). SEABEE COMBAT HANDBOOK, VOLUME 1. Naval Education and Training Center: Center for Seabees and Facilities Engineering (CSFE). https://nrtc.netc.navy.mil/courses/14234B/14234B_ind.pdf
 Bellott, T. G. (2009). NAVY EXPEDITIONARY SUPPORT. Retrieved from https://ntrl.ntis.gov/NTRL/dashboard/searchResults/titleDetail/ADA603365.xhtml
 Pike, P. (2013). Navy Cargo Handling And Port Group (NAVCHAPGRU). Retrieved from https://www.globalsecurity.org/military/agency/navy/navchapgru.htm
 Pine, J and Fabrey, T. (2015). SEABEE COMBAT HANDBOOK, VOLUME 2. Naval Education and Training Center: Center for Seabees and Facilities Engineering (CSFE). https://nrtc.netc.navy.mil/courses/14235B/14235B.pdf
 Brown, G. G. and Carlyle, W. M. (2008). Optimizing the US navy's combat logistics force. John Wiley and Sons Incorporated. Retrieved from https://www.engineeringvillage.com/search/doc/abstract.url&pageType=quickSearch&usageZone=resultslist&usageOrigin=searchresults&searchtype=Quick&SEARCHID=9b84c10aM0f1aM41f4Mabd0M39984f095aba&DOCINDEX=2&ignore_docid=cpx_30c22111e1c78063dM44d42061377553&database=1&format=quickSearchAbstractFormat&tagscope=&displayPagination=
 Houts Jr., R. E. (1990). Advanced technology in Navy Logistics Support. Naval Engineers Journal. Retrieved from https://www.engineeringvillage.com/search/doc/detailed.url SEARCHID=9b84c10aM0f1aM41f4Mabd0M39984f095aba&DOCINDEX=1&database=1&pageType=quickSearch&searchtype=Quick&dedupResultCount=null&format=quickSearchDetailedFormat&usageOrigin=recordpage&usageZone=abstracttab

Battalions of the United States Navy
Military logistics units and formations of the United States Navy